is a singer and a former member of the Japanese all-girl pop group AKB48.

Biography
In December 2005, Oshima became one of the 24 inaugural members of AKB48's Team A. Over the course of her career, she participated in most of AKB48's A-side singles. On April 26, 2007, it was announced that her contract would be transferred to Horipro. Upon joining the new talent agency, she was put on the roster of Xanadu loves NHC, a futsal team consisting of idols from Horipro; her jersey number was 18. Oshima made her first appearance on Kouhaku Uta Gassen, an annual music show where the most successful artists compete, with AKB48 on December 31, 2007.

On March 24, 2008, she participated in the opening party of Channel Café, a channel broadcasting simulator event, at Roppongi Hills, Tokyo. From April 2008, Oshima appeared regularly on the Movie Plus navigating show, Plus Style.

On February 21, 2009, she announced that she would be leaving AKB48, and, on April 26, she gave her final performance at NHK Hall.

Oshima made her solo debut in 2010 with the single "Mendokusai Aijō". It reached number seven and charted for 5 weeks. In 2012, she debut as an actress in the NHK drama Honjitsu wa Taian Nari.

Discography

Singles 
  (May 5, 2010) – Oricon Peak: 7, sales: 16,447
  (August 11, 2010) – Oricon Peak: 25, sales: 6,501
 "Second Lady" (July 27, 2011) – Oricon peak: 44, sales: 2,804

Filmography

Films 
 Crayon Shin-chan: The Storm Called: The Singing Buttocks Bomb (2007), Sarara
 Torihada: Gekijōban 2 (2014)

Dubbing 
 The Three Musketeers (2011)

TV dramas

Bibliography

Photobooks
 B.L.T. vivid 2 (Tokyo News Service, March 21, 2008) 
 Benkyō Sasete Itadakimashita (Wani Books, September 10, 2008) 
 Fairy Tale (Wani Books, January 25, 2010)

References

External links 
  at Avex 
 Official agency profile at HoriPro 

 Mai Oshima at Oricon 

AKB48 members
People from Noda, Chiba
Japanese women pop singers
Voice actresses from Chiba Prefecture
Avex Trax artists
Living people
1987 births
Japanese gravure idols
Japanese voice actresses
Japanese television personalities
Musicians from Chiba Prefecture
21st-century Japanese women singers
21st-century Japanese singers
21st-century Japanese actresses